Gymnopis multiplicata is a species of caecilian in the family Dermophiidae found in Costa Rica, Honduras, Nicaragua, Panama, and possibly Guatemala. Its natural habitats are subtropical or tropical dry forests, subtropical or tropical moist lowland forests, subtropical or tropical moist montane forests, pastureland, plantations, rural gardens, and urban areas.

References

multiplicata
Amphibians described in 1874
Taxa named by Wilhelm Peters
Taxonomy articles created by Polbot